Back Again is an album released by American jazz trombonist Bob Brookmeyer featuring tracks recorded in 1978 and originally released on the Sonet label.

Reception

Scott Yanow of AllMusic states: "This session was valve trombonist Bob Brookmeyer's first jazz date in 13 years after a period writing for the studios and then away from music altogether. Brookmeyer, who is featured in a quintet with cornetist Thad Jones, pianist Jimmy Rowles, bassist George Mraz and drummer Mel Lewis, proves to still be in prime form playing in an unchanged style".

Track listing
All compositions by Bob Brookmeyer except where noted.
 "Sweet and Lovely" (Gus Arnheim, Jules LeMare, Harry Tobias) - 8:30
 "Carib" - 4:07
 "Caravan" (Juan Tizol, Duke Ellington, Irving Mills) - 7:37
 "You'd Be So Nice to Come Home To" (Cole Porter) - 6:49
 "Willow Weep for Me" (Ann Ronell) - 3:45
 "I Love You" (Porter) - 5:58
 "In a Rotten Mood" - 5:55

Personnel 
Bob Brookmeyer - valve trombone
Thad Jones - cornet, flugelhorn
Jimmy Rowles - piano
George Mraz - bass  
Mel Lewis - drums

References 

1978 albums
Bob Brookmeyer albums
Sonet Records albums
Albums produced by Samuel Charters